The madeleine (or ) or petite madeleine is a traditional small cake from Commercy and Liverdun, two communes of the Lorraine region in northeastern France.

Madeleines are very small sponge cakes with a distinctive shell-like shape acquired from being baked in pans with shell-shaped depressions. Aside from the traditional moulded pan, commonly found in stores specialising in kitchen equipment and even hardware stores, no special tools are required to make madeleines. Madeleine-style cookies are popular in a number of culinary traditions. 

A génoise cake batter is used. The flavour is similar to, but somewhat lighter than, sponge cake. Traditional recipes include very finely ground nuts, usually almonds.  A variation uses lemon zest for a pronounced lemony taste.

British madeleines also use a génoise sponge but they are baked in dariole moulds. After cooking, these are coated in jam and desiccated coconut, and are usually topped with a glacé cherry.

History

Legend
Several legends are attached to the "invention" of the madeleines. They have tended to center on a female character named Madeleine who is said to have been in the service of an important character in the history of Lorraine – although there is no consensus over the last name of the cook nor the identity of the famous character. Some consider that the illustrious patron was 17th-century cardinal and rebel Paul de Gondi, who owned a castle in Commercy. Others consider that the inventor was named Madeleine Paulmier, who is said to have been a cook in the 18th century for Stanislaus I, duke of Lorraine and exiled King of Poland. The story goes that, in 1755, Louis XV, son-in-law of the duke, charmed by the little cakes prepared by Madeleine Paulmier, named them after her, while his wife, Maria Leszczyńska, introduced them soon afterward to the court in Versailles. Much beloved by the royal family, they conquered the rest of France in no time. Yet other stories have linked the cake with the pilgrimage to Compostela, in Spain: a pilgrim named Madeleine is said to have brought back the recipe from her voyage, or a cook named Madeleine is said to have offered little cakes in the shape of a shell to the pilgrims passing through Lorraine.

Other stories do not give the cake a Lorraine origin and lay its invention at the feet of pastry chef Jean Avice,  who worked in the kitchens of Prince Talleyrand. Avice is said to have invented the Madeleine in the 19th century by baking little cakes in aspic moulds.

First recipes
The term madeleine, used to describe a small cake, seems to appear for the first time in France in the middle of the 18th century. In 1758, a French retainer of an Irish Jacobite refugee in France, Lord Southwell, was said to prepare "cakes à la Madeleine and other small desserts".

The appearance of the madeleine is indicative of the increasing use of metal molds in European baking in the 18th century (see also Canelés), but the commercial success of the madeleine dates back to the early years of the 19th century. Several mentions of the madeleine are made by culinary writers during the Napoleonic era, in particular in the recipe books of Antonin Carême and by famous gastronomer Grimod de la Reynière.

In Commercy, the production at a large scale of madeleines is said to have begun in the 1760s. In addition to being sold at the Commercy rail station, thus accelerating their spread through the country, is likely that the cakes were exported to Paris along with the marmalade from Bar-le-duc and the croquantes from Rheims. By the end of the 19th century, the madeleine is considered a staple of the diet of the French bourgeoisie.

In the twentieth century
In a 1971 episode of The French Chef, "Madeleines and Génoise Jelly Roll", host Julia Child demonstrated how to make madeleines.

In the twenty-first century
Madeleines were chosen to represent France in the Café Europe initiative of the Austrian presidency of the European Union, on Europe Day 2006.

Literary reference

In In Search of Lost Time (also known as Remembrance of Things Past), author Marcel Proust uses madeleines to contrast involuntary memory with voluntary memory. The latter designates memories retrieved by "intelligence", that is, memories produced by putting conscious effort into remembering events, people, and places. Proust's narrator laments that such memories are inevitably partial, and do not bear the "essence" of the past. The most famous instance of involuntary memory by Proust is known as the "episode of the madeleine", yet there are at least half a dozen other examples in In Search of Lost Time.

See also
 Bahulu, a Malaysian version of madeleines, inspired by European influence 
 Financier, a similar cake with ground almonds and much more butter

References

French cakes
In Search of Lost Time